Saint Euthymios of Zela the Ethno-Hieromartyr,, born Eustratios Agritellis, 1876–1921, was the last resident Bishop of the Diocese of Zela near Amasia, Western Pontus, which he served from June 12, 1912  until his death on May 29, 1921, during the period of the Greek genocide.

His memory is celebrated on May 29, as well as on the Sunday before the Exaltation of the Holy Cross.

Early life
Saint Euthymios was born on July 6, 1876 in the village of Parakila on Lesbos island, where he started his education. At the age of nine he entered the 'Leimonias school', located within the Leimonos Monastery, from where he graduated in 1892.

In the meantime, he was tonsured a monk by the Hegumen of the monastery, Archmandrite Anthimos (Georgiellis), who gave him the name Euthymios. For the next eight years he practiced asceticism in the Leimonos Monastery.

In 1900 he was sent by the monastery to the Theological School of Halki, where he studied from 1900 to 1907. In 1906 he was ordained a deacon by Metropolitan Agathangelos of Grevena, and in 1907 he completed his thesis entitled: "The purpose of monastic life in the East until the 9th century AD."

After his graduation, he returned to Lesbos, where Metropolitan Stephen (Soulidis) of Methymna appointed him the head of the Leimonos School, as well as the itinerant preacher (hierokeryx) of the Metropolis of Methymna. He performed this role between 1909-1910, during which time he was known for his prowess as an orator and the rich content of his sermons. In the 1909-10 school year, he served as headmaster in the municipality of Gera, in the region of Mytilene.

In 1910 he was ordained a priest by Metropolitan Stephen (Soulidis) of Methymna, and served as the protosynkellos of the Metropolis of Methymna until 1912.

In 1912 the Metropolitan of Amasya Germanos Karavangelis (based in Samsun), who was himself a native of Lesbos, received Euthymios as his general commissioner. It is said that the Ecumenical Patriarch himself Joachim III first introduced Euthymios to Metropolitan Germanos, having been informed of the talents of the young clergyman. Thus the Great Church of Christ promoted Euthymios as assistant bishop to the Metropolitan of Amasya, bestowing upon him the illustrious high title of old, of Western Pontus, that of Bishop of Zela (modern Zile). His ordination to the highest order of the Church took place on June 12, 1912, in Constantinople.

Bishop of Zela
Over the next ten years, in the midst of adverse and tragic circumstances, Bishop Euthymios served the vast Metropolis of Amasya, which was the most extensive in Asia Minor, comprising 340 Orthodox communities and a population of over 130,000 Orthodox, who were mostly Turkish in appearance, but Greek in identity. He largely governed the Metropolis of Amasya alone, due to the frequent trips of Metropolitan Germanos to Constantinople and Athens. During his tenure the Metropolis of Amasya started to show signs of unusual progress and revival, including the formation of youth and community organizations. In 1913 in the district of Pafra and in several villages of Western Pontus, he founded many churches, schools for boys, schools for girls, and took care to ensure the proper placement of priests and teachers.

However a short time thereafter, the great persecution of the Anatolian Greeks erupted, especially in the regions of Samsun and Pafra. From then on the activities of the Bishop of Zela changed from efforts for progress and revival, into struggles for relief and retrenchment. He transitioned untiringly from place to place, oftentimes in danger and tried by deprivations and malaise, in order to provide his assistance to those he found in despair or in exile, and to the distressed Orthodox Christians.

Adversity and war
Throughout the First World War he urged all of the schools and the people of Pontus to remain united in remembrance of an annual ethnic ceremony which commemorated the female mass suicide of 30-40 young girls from the village of Hazar in 1680, who preferred to fall from a fortress (known as the 'fortress of Ali') into a 150-meter precipice, rather than to fall into the hands of the Turks. This ceremony was observed on the anniversary of March 25th each year in remembrance of the self-sacrifice of the young girls.

In April 1917 a large force of the Turkish army sent by Refet Bele Pasha and commanded by Mehmet Ali encircled the monastery of the Theotokos near the village of Otkaya (Otkayada), on the west side of Mount Neltes (Nebyan), where the cave called Maara (or the Virgin or Magara) was located, encircling 650 women and children and 60 armed rebels. After six days of resistance most of the besieged were killed or committed suicide. Of those that were captured many of the young girls and women were dishonored, the children shot, and the men beheaded.

In 1919, in response to this act, on the forefeast of the Dormition of the Theotokos, Euthymios gathered 12,000 insurgents outside of the small town of Çağşur (Esençay), under the command of Kyriakos Papadopoulos, resulting in the complete destruction of the Turkish armed forces and the town. From that day onwards Euthymios was considered a wanted man by the Kemalist Turks who viewed him as a leader of the insurgents of Western Pontus. He and other notables were restricted in their activities and suffered due to the interrogations they underwent. The jails were filled with Christians of every age and social status. Everywhere there was exile, the gallows, disgrace, and the sword and fire.

In 1921, by a decision of the Kemalist government, all the Metropolitans, Bishops, and Archimandrites of the Pontus region were obliged to abandon Pontus and leave their seats. The only hierarchs who did not obey this order were Metropolitan Chrysanthos (Philippidis) of Trebizond, Bishop Euthymios of Zela, and Protosyngellos Archimandrite Platon (Aivazidis) of Amasya.

Imprisonment and martyrdom
On January 21, 1921, the Kemalists captured Bishop Euthymios and Archimandrite Platon (Aivazidis), along with many other notables of the city of Amasya. They were condemned to death, and were imprisoned in the Souyia prison in Amasya.

Aware of the ill-treatments and tortures of those arrested with him, and desiring to relieve their suffering, he appealed to the Kemalist government of Ankara to be regarded as the only culprit, and to be the only one punished, in order to allow his fellow prisoners to be released. However he received no response.

His imprisonment continued relatively mildly until April 18, 1921, the day of Pascha. On that day, without being noticed by the jailer, he entered a hall where many expatriates were being detained in isolation, in order to console and encourage them. As a result of this action he became even more suspect, and was isolated in the damp basements of the jails from then onwards. It was through the testimony of other prisoners that were released, that his tortures were made publicly known afterwards, affirming his isolation and sufferings in prison. Sometimes his voice would be heard chanting the memorial service for the repose of departed, which he was chanting on his own behalf.

On the forty-first day of his isolation, on May 29, 1921, completely exhausted from the hardships, deprivations and tortures, he died in custody. It was the irony of fate that his conviction  from the high court in Ankara arrived after his death, with the sentence being the 'Independence of death'. Nevertheless, his dead body was hanged in the central square of the town together with the others who had been sentenced to death including politicians, businessmen, journalists and religious figures of the local Greek community. Afterwards his guardians buried him quietly in the courtyard of the adjacent church.

Thus the Bishop of Zela sealed the good course of his life, by preferring faith and country over death, and becoming a forerunner of other ethnomartyr hierarchs, which were to be martyred in the following catastrophic year for Hellenism (that is, the Asia Minor Catastrophe) in 1922.

On May 30, 1936 on the fifteenth anniversary of his martyrdom, the Leimonos Monastery in Lesbos celebrated the unveiling of his bust. Since then the white likeness of his image reminds pilgrims of the sacrifice of a shepherd who laid down his life for the sheep and remained faithful unto death.

Glorification
In 1992 Euthymios was numbered among the chorus of the Saints by the Holy Synod of the Church of Greece.

In 1998 a chapel was built in honour of the Saint at Leimonos Monastery, in the Holy Metropolis of Methymna.

Among the manuscripts at Leimonos Monastery, there are fifty items written in his hand, most of which are notebooks from the time of his studies in Halki.

See also
 Amasya trials
 Greek genocide
 Euthymius (disambiguation)

Notes

Citations

Sources

 Great Synaxaristes:  Ὁ Ἅγιος Εὐθύμιος ὁ Ἱερομάρτυρας Ἐπίσκοπος Ζήλων. ΜΕΓΑΣ ΣΥΝΑΞΑΡΙΣΤΗΣ. 29 Μαΐου.
  Αθαν. Γ. Τσερνογλου. "Εὐθύμιος. Ὁ Ἀγριτέλλης. Έθνομάρτυς ἐπίσκοπος Ζήλων Ἀμασείας (1912-1921)." Θρησκευτική και Ηθική Εγκυκλοπαίδεια (ΘΗΕ). Τόμος 5 (Διοκλητιανός-Ζώτος). Αθηναι – Αθαν. Μαρτινος, 1964. σελ. 1046–1048.
 St. Efthymios Agritellis. Holy Patriarchal and Stavropegial Leimonos Monastery. Retrieved: 12 August 2014.

1876 births
1921 deaths
20th-century Christian saints
20th-century Eastern Orthodox bishops
20th-century Eastern Orthodox martyrs
Eastern Orthodox saints
Executed priests
People who died in the Greek genocide
Bishops of the Ecumenical Patriarchate of Constantinople
Ottoman Pontians
People from Lesbos
People murdered in Turkey
Saints from Anatolia
Christian saints killed by Muslims
Theological School of Halki alumni